Daniil Aleksandrovich (Russian: Даниил Александрович; 1261 – 4 March 1303) was the youngest son of Alexander Nevsky and forefather of all the Grand Dukes of Moscow.

Early life
Prince Daniel of Moscow was born at Vladimir, capital of the Great Vladimir-Suzdal principality, in 1261. He was the fourth and youngest son of Saint Prince Alexander Nevsky—famous in the history of the Russian State and the Russian Orthodox Church — and his second wife, Princess Vassa.  One of the most junior princes in the House of Rurik, Daniel is thought to have been named after his celebrated relative, Daniel of Galicia.

Government

His father died when he was only two years old. Of his father's patrimonies, he received the least valuable, Moscow.

Daniel has been credited with founding the first Moscow monasteries, namely the Lord's Epiphany, and The Danilov Monestery (Saint Daniel Monestery): named in his honor, situated on the right bank of the Moskva River at a distance of 5 miles from the Moscow Kremlin, and founded, by Daniel, as the first monastery wooden church of St. Daniel-Stylite no later than 1282.

He also built the first stone church in the Moscow Kremlin in the 1280s, dedicated to the Great Martyr Demetrius.

Daniel took part in his brothers'—Dmitri of Pereslavl and Andrey of Gorodets—struggle for the right to govern Vladimir and Novgorod, respectively. After Dmitry's death in 1294, Daniel made an alliance with Mikhail of Tver and Ivan of Pereslavl against Andrey of Gorodets of Novgorod. 

Daniel's participation in the struggle for Novgorod in 1296 indicated Moscow's increasing political influence. Constantine, the prince of Ryazan, tried to capture the Moscow lands with the help of a Mongol force. Prince Daniel defeated it near Pereslavl. This was a first victory over the Tatars, though not a tremendous victory, but it was noteworthy as a first push towards freedom. 

In 1301, he went to Ryazan with an army and imprisoned the ruler of the Ryazan Principality "by some ruse", as the chronicle says, and destroyed a multitude of Tatars. To secure his release, the prisoner ceded to Daniel his fortress of Kolomna. It was an important acquisition, as now Daniel controlled all the length of the Moskva River. 

In 1302 his childless nephew and ally, Ivan of Pereslavl, bequeathed to Daniel all his lands, including Pereslavl-Zalessky.

During the Mongol occupation and internecine wars among the Rus' princes, Daniel created peace in Moscow without bloodshed. During 30 years of ruling Daniel participated in battles only once. According to legend, Daniel was popular and respected by his subjects for his meekness, humility and peacefulness.

Death and canonization 
At the age of 42 on the 5th of March in 1303 St. Daniel died.  Before his death he became a monk and, according to his will, was buried in the cemetery of the St. Daniel Monastery.  This was a common cemetery and by being buried there he was demonstrating humility. He was canonized by the Russian Orthodox Church in 1791 but only for local veneration.  

In the year 1330, the monastery was moved to Kremlin and the monastery was turned into a common parish.  The cemetery became open to the  public and his grave was lost.  On August 30, 1652, many relics from Daniel of Moscow were found and were placed in a tomb in the Danilov Monastery in his honor.

Marriage and children

His wife was named Maria. They had at least six children:

Yury of Moscow (1281 – 21 September 1325).
Aleksandr Daniilovich (died Autumn 1308).
Boris Daniilovich, Prince of Kostroma (died 1320).
Afanasy Daniilovich, Prince of Novgorod (died 1322).
Fedora Daniilovna. Married Yaroslav Romanovich, Prince of Ryazan (died 1299).
Ivan I of Moscow (1288 – 31 March 1340).

See also

 Bibliography of Russian history (1223–1613)
Rulers of Russia family tree

References

External links
 

1261 births
1303 deaths
13th-century Grand Princes of Moscow
14th-century Grand Princes of Moscow
Russian saints
Rurik dynasty
Yurievichi family
14th-century Christian saints
Eastern Orthodox monarchs